Alan Edward Woods (15 February 1937 – 28 September 2021) was an English footballer who played as a wing half. Woods was capped by the England national youth team in 1955 while a Tottenham Hotspur player. He died in September 2021.

His son Neil Woods and grandson Michael Woods are also active in football.

References

External links

1937 births
2021 deaths
People from Dinnington, South Yorkshire
English footballers
England youth international footballers
Association football midfielders
Tottenham Hotspur F.C. players
Swansea City A.F.C. players
York City F.C. players
Boston United F.C. players
English Football League players
Footballers from South Yorkshire